Manatu block is one of the administrative  blocks of Palamu district, Jharkhand state, Inmanatu
dia. According to census (2001), the block has 18,083 households with aggregate population of 97,622. The block has 190 villages.

See also
 Palamu Loksabha constituency
 Jharkhand Legislative Assembly
 Jharkhand
 Palamu

References
Blocks of Palamu district

Community development blocks in Jharkhand
Community development blocks in Palamu district